Kingaham is a rural locality in the Somerset Region, Queensland, Australia.

Geography 
Over half of the land in Kingaham is state forest, including Yabba State Forest in the north, Jimna State Forest in the south, and Diaper State Forest in the south-west. The remaining land is freehold, predominantly used for cattle grazing.

History 
In 1887,  of land were resumed from the Yabba pastoral run for the establishment of small farms. The land was offered for selection on 17 April 1887.

References 

Suburbs of Somerset Region
Localities in Queensland